Adrian Francis Branch (born November 17, 1963) is a retired American professional basketball player.

A 6'7" small forward out of DeMatha High School, Branch starred at the University of Maryland from 1981 to 1985. He was an All-ACC second team selection twice. In 1984 Branch led the Terrapins to the ACC Championship. He finished his career at Maryland as their second all-time leading scorer. In 2004, Branch was honored at the ACC Tournament as an "ACC Legend."

Branch was drafted into the NBA in the second round by the Chicago Bulls in 1985. He played a reserve role with the Los Angeles Lakers when they won the NBA Championship in 1987. He later played in Australia for the NBL's Geelong Supercats and Brisbane Bullets, as well as playing in Spain, France, Monaco, Thailand, Philippines, Israel, Turkey and the Dominican Republic.

Branch has worked with Sportsworld Ministries, Fellowship of Christian Athletes (FCA) Young Life, Youth for Christ, Youth With A Mission (YWAM), Athletes in Action (AIA) and Sports Power International.

In 2004, Branch became a television color analyst for the NBA's Charlotte Bobcats games. He joined ESPN in 2007 as a college basketball analyst.

Notes

External links
More info about Adrian Branch
NBA stats @ basketballreference.com
Player Profile - Safsal.co.il 

1963 births
Living people
African-American basketball players
American Christians
American expatriate basketball people in Australia
American expatriate basketball people in France
American expatriate basketball people in Israel
American expatriate basketball people in the Philippines
American expatriate basketball people in Spain
American expatriate basketball people in Turkey
American men's basketball players
Baltimore Lightning players
Basketball players from Washington, D.C.
Canberra Cannons players
Charlotte Bobcats announcers
Chicago Bulls draft picks
College basketball announcers in the United States
DeMatha Catholic High School alumni
Israeli Basketball Premier League players
Liga ACB players
Los Angeles Lakers players
Maryland Terrapins men's basketball players
McDonald's High School All-Americans
Minnesota Timberwolves players
New Jersey Nets players
Parade High School All-Americans (boys' basketball)
Portland Trail Blazers players
Sioux Falls Skyforce (CBA) players
Small forwards
Magnolia Hotshots players
Philippine Basketball Association imports
21st-century African-American people
20th-century African-American sportspeople